Endoclita minanus is a species of moth of the family Hepialidae. It is known from Fujian, China.

References

External links
Hepialidae genera

Moths described in 1992
Hepialidae